The Healey Building, at 57 Forsyth Street NW, in the Fairlie-Poplar district of Atlanta, was the last major skyscraper built in that city during the pre-World War I construction boom.  Designed by the firm of Morgan & Dillon, with assistance from Walter T. Downing, in the Gothic Revival style, the 16-story structure was built between 1913-1914.  It was originally planned with two facing towers connected by an atrium, taking up an entire city block.  The east tower along Broad Street was never constructed due to World War I and the subsequent death of owner William T. Healey (son of developer Thomas G. Healey) in 1920.

The building remained in the Healey family until 1972.  On August 8, 1977, it was listed on the National Register of Historic Places, and since 1987 it has enjoyed local landmark status.  In 2001, the upper floors were converted into condominiums, while the lower floors continue to be the home of galleries, shops, and restaurants.

References

External links

 The Healey Condominiums

Office buildings completed in 1914
John Robert Dillon buildings
Residential skyscrapers in Atlanta
Gothic Revival architecture in Georgia (U.S. state)
Unfinished buildings and structures in the United States
Commercial buildings on the National Register of Historic Places in Georgia (U.S. state)
Residential condominiums in the United States
City of Atlanta-designated historic sites
National Register of Historic Places in Atlanta